Chapanlu (also Romanized as Chapānlū; also known as Chappeh and Chapeh) is a village in Sivkanlu Rural District, in the Central District of Shirvan County, North Khorasan Province, Iran. At the 2006 census, its population was 149, in 47 families.

References 

Populated places in Shirvan County